Kalevi Kostiainen (born 7 March 1967) is a Finnish sailor. He competed in the Tornado event at the 1992 Summer Olympics.

References

External links
 

1967 births
Living people
Finnish male sailors (sport)
Olympic sailors of Finland
Sailors at the 1992 Summer Olympics – Tornado
People from Tuusula
Sportspeople from Uusimaa